This is a list of the German Media Control Top100 Singles & Top100 Albums Charts number-ones of 2009.

Number-one hits by week

See also
 List of number-one hits (Germany)
 List of German airplay number-one songs

References

External links
 charts.de
 germancharts.com

Number-one hits
Germany
2009
2009